The Valea Racilor is a left tributary of the river Jilț in Romania. It flows into the Jilț near Baniu.

References

Rivers of Romania
Rivers of Gorj County